Ato Panford born August 28 1962 is a Ghanaian politician and member of the Seventh Parliament of the Fourth Republic of Ghana representing the Shama Constituency in the Western Region on the ticket of the New Patriotic Party.

He obtained a BSC in Engineering as well as an M.B.A from the University of Southampton

Ato Panford is a Ghanaian politician and member of the Seventh Parliament of the Fourth Republic of Ghana who represented the Shama Constituency in the Western Region on the ticket of the New Patriotic Party.

NPP Primaries 
Building up to the 2020 parliamentary elections, the New Patriotic Party (NPP) organized its parliamentary primaries to elect  a candidate to represent the party. Ato Panford participated but lost to his contender Lawyer Samuel Erickson Abakah who later won in the general elections.

References

Ghanaian MPs 2017–2021
1962 births
Living people
New Patriotic Party politicians